West Virginia Route 90 is a  long north–south state highway in the Eastern Panhandle of West Virginia. The route, located within Tucker County and Grant County, runs parallel to the Maryland state line for most of its length. The southern terminus of the route is at U.S. Route 219 one mile (1.6 km) north of Thomas.

Major intersections

References

090
Transportation in Tucker County, West Virginia
Transportation in Grant County, West Virginia